Isaac Daniel Hooson (2 September 1880 – 18 October 1948), or I. D. Hooson as he was commonly known, was a Welsh solicitor and poet.

Hooson was born to parents Edward Hooson and his wife Harriet in Victoria House, Market St. in the village of Rhosllannerchrugog, Wrexham, Wales. He was educated at the Rhos board school and Ruabon grammar school. His grandfather was one of a group of lead miners who left Cornwall for Wales and settled in Flintshire. Isaac's father Edward moved to Rhosllannerchrugog from Holywell, Flintshire, as an apprentice grocer and, later, set up his own grocers and drapery shop in Rhos.

During his lifetime he published only one collection, Cerddi a Baledi, written in the years 1930-36 and published in 1936, but a second collection of his work, Y Gwin a Cherddi Eraill, was published after his death in 1948. Hooson is best known for his poems written for children and he also wrote a Welsh language adaptation of The Pied Piper of Hamelin under the title Y Fantell Fraith in 1934.

In compliance with his wishes I. D. Hooson's ashes were scattered above the eastern end of Panorama Walk in the vale of Llangollen where a stone memorial stands in his memory. The monument is easily accessed by pathway leading northwestwards from a small roadside parking area [Grid ref: SJ 2471 2480] just west of the cattle grid. Ysgol I D Hooson, in Rhosllanerchrugog, is a Welsh-language school named after the poet.

References

1880 births
1948 deaths
Welsh solicitors
Welsh lawyers
People from Rhosllanerchrugog
People educated at Ruabon Grammar School
20th-century Welsh poets
20th-century Welsh lawyers